Lippelo is a village in the Belgian province of Antwerp. It is a part of the municipality of Puurs-Sint-Amands. Lippelo has a population of 1,138 as of 2021.

History 
Lippelo was an independent municipality until 1976. Then, it became, along with Oppuurs, part of the municipality of Sint-Amands.

Demography

Evolution of the population

19th century

20th century until 1976

References 

Populated places in Antwerp Province
Puurs-Sint-Amands